Piliyavayal  is a village in the Arimalamrevenue block of Pudukkottai district, Tamil Nadu, India.

Demographics 

As per the 2001 census, Piliyavayal had a total population of 1117 with 484 males and 633 females. Out of the total population 563 people were literate.

References

Villages in Pudukkottai district